BabuBabu is a common given name in India, also found in other cultures.

Notable people with this name
 Jagapati Babu, Indian film actor
 Fazlur Rahman Babu, Bangladeshi actor
 DJ Babu, Filipino-American DJ and member of Dilated Peoples
 N. Chandrababu Naidu (often referred to as 'Babu'), Indian politician
 Ram Kishore Shukla, Indian National Congress Leader
 Mahesh Babu, Indian actor
 Babu, first bishop of Nisibis, succeeded by Jacob of Nisibis
 Prasad Babu, South Indian film actor, who acted in Telugu and Tamil films
 D. Babu Paul (born 1941), former member of the Indian Administrative Service 
 B. Santosh Babu, Indian Army officer 
 D. Suresh Babu, Indian film producer
 Nagendra Babu, Indian film actor and producer
 Babu Ram Mandial, Indian politician
 Babu Mohan, Indian film comedian
 Babu Namboothiri, Indian film actor in Malayalam movies
 Babu Antony, Indian film actor in Malayalam movies
 Babu Janardhanan, Indian film director in Malayalam movies
 Babu Narayanan, Indian film director in Malayalam movies
 Idavela Babu, Indian film actor in Malayalam movies
As a nickname
 Anderson Rodney de Oliveira, known as 'Babù', Brazilian footballer
 Pablo Marquez, Ecuadorian wrestler with the ring name 'Babu'
 K. D. Singh, Indian hockey player nicknamed 'Babu'
 Babu Bajrangi, a criminal from India, responsible for the deaths of many people in 2002.

Fictional characters
 Babu Bhatt, Pakistani character on the sitcom Seinfeld
 Babu, character in Jeannie (TV series)
 Baby Babu, fake baby monkey adopted by "The Creatures, LLC" 

 Babu Rao Ganpat Rao Apte, a character in Comedy Film series, Hera Pheri (film series)played by Paresh Rawal

See also
Babu (title)
Babu (disambiguation)

References

Indian given names